Before the Storm may refer to:

 Before the Storm (novel), a 1996 novel by Michael P. Kube-McDowell in the Star Wars: Black Fleet Crisis trilogy
 Before the Storm (2000 film), a 2000 Swedish film Före stormen directed by Reza Parsa
 Ill Wind (film) or Before the Storm, a 2007 French film
 Before the Storm: Barry Goldwater and the Unmaking of the American Consensus, a 2001 political history book by Rick Perlstein
 Life Is Strange: Before the Storm, a 2017 episodic video game and a prequel to Life Is Strange

Music 
 Before the Storm (Darude album), 2000
 B4 the Storm, a 2020 album by Internet Money
 Before the Storm (Jack Savoretti album), 2012
 Before the Storm (Samson album), 1982
 Before the Storm (mixtape), a 2010 mixtape by Tinchy Strider
 "Before the Storm", a song by Queensrÿche from The Warning, 1984
 "Before the Storm", a song by Jonas Brothers and Miley Cyrus from Lines, Vines and Trying Times

See also 
 After the Storm (disambiguation)